The ventral anterior nucleus (VA) is a nucleus of the thalamus. It acts with the anterior part of the ventral lateral nucleus to modify signals from the basal ganglia.

Inputs and outputs
The ventral anterior nucleus receives neuronal inputs from the basal ganglia. Its main afferent fibres are from the globus pallidus. The efferent fibres from this nucleus pass into the premotor cortex for initiation and planning of movement.

Functions
It helps to function in movement by providing feedback for the outputs of the basal ganglia.

Additional images

References

Thalamus